The parai is a traditional Tamil frame drum about 35 centimeters in diameter, used in the parai attam dance. It consists of a shallow ring of wood, covered on one side with a stretched cow hide that is glued to the wooden frame. The preferred wood is neem wood, although other types may be used. The shell is made up of three pieces of wood each in the shape of an arc, held together by three metal plates. The parai is played with two sticks.

Technique

The parai is slung by a strap over one shoulder (weak or off-hand side) and is held vertically by pushing it towards the performer's body. This harness allows the drummer to play while standing, walking, or dancing. It is played with two sticks: a long, thin flat bamboo stick (approx. 28 cm) called Sindu Kuchi or Sundu Kuchi (Tamil:சுண்டு குச்சி) and a short, thick stick (approx. 18 cm) that may be of any wood, called Adi Kucchi (Tamil:அடி குச்சி).

The short stick is loosely held between the thumb and three other fingers, index, middle, and ring, of the strong or dominant hand. It is held vertically, positioned near the lower rim of the drum. The off or weak hand, which holds the long stick, rests on the upper part of the frame. This stick is positioned at a downward-pointing angle. The base of the stick is gripped by the thumb and index fingers and balanced between the middle and ring fingers; the stick is moved back and forth using the ring finger and thumb respectively. There are three fundamental strokes from which all of the rhythmic patterns are derived: striking the center of the drum with the shorter stick; "slapping" the center of the drum with the long stick; and striking the drum with both sticks, the dominant immediately followed by the off. 

Just before the commencement of every performance, drummers will heat the parai, holding it close to a small bonfire, so that the heat absorbs the moisture in the drum heads and tightens them considerably. After heating, the drums produce a loud, high-pitched cracking sound when struck.

Rhythms
Otthaiyadi
Thenmangu
Samiaatam
Thullal
Uyirppu

History
In Tamil, the word parai means "to speak" or "to tell". The drums were used for multiple purposes including signaling  people to gather, alerting them to upcoming war, requesting civilians to leave the battlefield, announcing victory or defeat, stopping a breach of water body, gathering farmers for farming activities, warning wild animals about people's presence, during festivals, weddings and other celebrations, and as part of worship of nature. There were as many as 156 traditional drum beats or adi for different purposes and designating different emotions. The drums were played in the royal courts of Sangam, Chola, and Pandiyan rulers. It is one of the earliest percussion instruments and is mentioned in Tholkaapiam as a standard musical instrument. It and the parai attam dance have become symbols of Tamil culture. It was only later called thappu (meaning "inauspicious") to derogate Tamil arts during the 14th century AD Vijayanagara rule of Tamil land.

Types

See also
Paraiyar
Tamil culture

References

External links

 Australia Tamil Arts Tamil Arts - YouTube
 Parai: Mother of Percussion, a short video by The Educational Multimedia Research Center of Anna University
 This Is a Music: Reclaiming an Untouchable Drum (2011), description of an ethnomusicological documentary film about parai drummers
உலகம் முழுக்க பறை ஒலிக்கட்டும்!
"பறை இனி இறப்புக்கான இசை இல்லை!"

Indian musical instruments
Membranophones
Medicine drums
Tamil culture
Tamil music
Tamil Nadu